Mylo can refer to:

 Justin Mylo, Dutch DJ
 Mylo Hubert Vergara, Filipino bishop
 Mylo, North Dakota
 Mylo (musician), Scottish electronic musician
 mylo (Sony), a Sony portable, Skype-compliant, Wi-Fi messaging device
 Mylo Xyloto, the fifth studio album by British alternative rock band Coldplay

See also 
 Milo (disambiguation)